Esenciales: Sol is a CD compilation album (seventeenth overall) by the Latin American Mexican rock band Maná. It is one of three greatest hits compilation albums, along with Esenciales: Eclipse and Esenciales: Luna, with remastered versions of all their best-known songs. Esenciales: Sol includes a previously unreleased song, "Te Llevaré Al Cielo", and a bonus track, "Tonto En La Lluvia'" (in English:"Fool in the Rain"), a song by Led Zeppelin from their In Through the Out Door album. The album also includes two music videos.

Track listing

Singles

Chart performance
In 2006, the album peaked at #31 in Spain.

Certifications

Music videos
 Oye Mi Amor
 Ángel De Amor

References

Maná compilation albums
2003 compilation albums
Warner Music Group compilation albums